Grandmaster Alex Anatole (born in Moscow,  USSR) is a Taoist priest, teacher, and writer.   He directs centers of Taoist studies in Europe, Australia and the United States.

Life and career
Grandmaster Alex Anatole was born in Moscow, USSR. Immigrating to the United States in 1976, he began teaching the physical elements of traditional Taoism, including internal/external qi quong and meditation.

Temple of Original Simplicity

In 1978 Grandmaster Alex Anatole founded the Center of Traditional Taoist Studies (originally The New England Center of Tao) near Boston. He established close ties to established temples in Shanghai, China.

The temple houses a wide collection of Taoist Deities, as well as, perhaps, the only Hall of Celestial Foxes (Chinese: Huxian, Japanese:kitsune, Korean: kumiho) in the United States.

The temple offers traditional Taoist teachings including the philosophical teachings of the Tao Te Ching, meditation, Qi Gong, as well as the esoteric disciplines of The Celestial Fox Creed.

The Center of Traditional Taoist Studies also offers Lin Hun Therapy and Taoist Divine Guidance, which were officially recognized by the US Patent and Trademark Office in 2019. (Reg#: 5,945,459 and 6,974,275)

Publications
 The Truth of Tao (Center for Traditional Taoist Studies, Weston, Massachusetts, 2005), an analysis and application of the Taoist philosophy to life in the western world.
The Essence of Tao (Center for Traditional Taoist Studies, Weston, Massachusetts, 2009) A lineage master's interpretation of the core chapters of the Tao Te Ching.
The Tao of Celestial Foxes-The Way to Immortality Vol. I, II, III (Center for Traditional Taoist Studies, Weston, Massachusetts, 2015, 2016, 2017) A Fox Master's explanation of the Fox Creed.
A Synopsis of Taoist Teachings for the West (Center for Traditional Taoist Studies, Weston, Massachusetts, 2019)

References

Further reading
"Tracing the Contours of Daoism in North America" by Louis Komjathy Nova Religion November 2004, Vol. 8, No. 2, Pages 5–27 (university of California Press)

External links
 Official website
 Profile at Harvard University's Pluralism Project
 The Complete Idiot's Guide to Taoism  Brandon Toropov, Chadwick Hansen
 List of Daoist teachers in North America compiled by Professor Louis Komjathy of Pacific Lutheran University

Living people
American spiritual writers
American spiritual teachers
American people of Russian descent
Soviet emigrants to the United States
Russian Taoists
American Taoists
Year of birth missing (living people)